Venyov is a town and the administrative center of Venyovsky District in Tula Oblast, Russia, located on the Venyovka River,  east of Tula, the administrative center of the oblast. Population:

History
It was granted town status in 1777. During the Battle of Moscow in 1941, the town fell to the 2nd Panzer Group under Heinz Guderian on 24 November 1941. The short German occupation lasted until 9 December 1941, when Venyov was liberated by troops of the Western Front of the Red Army.

Administrative and municipal status
Within the framework of administrative divisions, Venyov serves as the administrative center of Venyovsky District. As an administrative division, it is incorporated within Venyovsky District as Venyov Town Under District Jurisdiction. As a municipal division, Venyov Town Under District Jurisdiction is incorporated within Venyovsky Municipal District as Venyov Urban Settlement.

References

Sources

Notes

Cities and towns in Tula Oblast
Venyovsky Uyezd